Sergey Aleksandrovich Prudnikov (born 1 July 1985 in Oryol, Russia) is a Russian bobsledder who has competed since 2007. His best World Cup finish was tied for second in the four-man event at Park City, Utah on 14 November 2009.

Prudnikov's best finish at the FIBT World Championships was fifth in the mixed team event at Lake Placid, New York in 2009.

He finished seventh in the two-man event and tied for ninth in the four-man event at the 2010 Winter Olympics in Vancouver.

References

1985 births
Bobsledders at the 2010 Winter Olympics
Living people
Olympic bobsledders of Russia
Sportspeople from Bryansk
Russian male bobsledders